Micropterix montanella is a species of moth belonging to the family Micropterigidae. It was described by Zagulajev in 1983. It is known from Abkhazia, Georgia, including Adjara and along the Caucasian coast of the Black Sea.

References

Micropterigidae
Moths described in 1983
Moths of Asia
Taxa named by Aleksei Konstantinovich Zagulyaev